"Sooner or Later" is a song by English singer Duncan James. It was written by James, Chris Braide and Jez Ashurst for James' debut solo album, Future Past (2006), while production was helmed by Stephen Lipson. The song was released as the album's lead single on 5 June 2006 and is James' debut solo single after 2004's duet "I Believe My Heart". "Sooner or Later" peaked at number 35 on the UK Singles Chart and found reasonable success in Italy and the Flemish region of Belgium, peaking at number three and number two, respectively.

Track listings

Charts

Weekly charts

Year-end charts

References

2006 songs
2006 debut singles
Duncan James songs
Innocent Records singles
Song recordings produced by Stephen Lipson
Songs written by Duncan James